Frank Camilo Morejón Reyes (born January 25, 1986) is a Cuban professional baseball catcher for the Parmaclima Parma of the Italian Baseball League. In Cuba, he plays for the Industriales of the Cuban National Series. 

In international play, he played for the Cuba national baseball team in the 2010 World University Baseball Championship, 2011 Pan American Games, 2011 Baseball World Cup, 2012 Haarlem Baseball Week, 2013 World Baseball Classic, 2013 World Port Tournament, 2014 Central American and Caribbean Games, 2015 Pan American Games, 2015 Premier 12 and 2017 World Baseball Classics. Considered unlikely to defect, he received permission from the Cuban government to play for the Kitchener Panthers of the Intercounty Baseball League in 2016.

On March 8, 2018, Morejón signed with the Parmaclima Parma of the Italian Baseball League.

References

External links

Living people
1986 births
Cuban baseball players
Baseball catchers
2013 World Baseball Classic players
2017 World Baseball Classic players
Metropolitanos de La Habana players
Industriales de La Habana players
Alazanes de Granma players
Pan American Games medalists in baseball
Pan American Games bronze medalists for Cuba
Baseball players at the 2015 Pan American Games
Medalists at the 2015 Pan American Games